Eye of the Tiger is the third album by American rock band Survivor, released in 1982. It reached #2 on the US Billboard 200 chart.

The album features the title track, which is also the theme song of the film Rocky III. The single went to #1 in both the US and UK, while "American Heartbeat" reached #17 in the US. Both singles also made the charts in Germany.

Following the temporary disbandment of Survivor in 1989, Jimi Jamison recorded a cover of "Ever Since the World Began" for the film Lock Up.

Reception

AllMusic's brief retrospective review was dismissive of the album, declaring that "nothing here really scales the same height as the title track".

Track listing
All tracks written by Jim Peterik & Frankie Sullivan, Except "The One That Really Matters"  written by Peterik.

Publishing
All songs copyright Holy Moley Music, Rude Music, WB Music Corp. & Easy Action Music, except track 4 (WB Music Corp. & Easy Action Music).

Personnel 
Survivor
 Dave Bickler – lead vocals
 Jim Peterik – grand piano, Hammond B3 organ, electric guitars, acoustic 12-string guitar, backing vocals
 Frankie Sullivan – lead guitar, rhythm guitar, acoustic 12-string guitar, backing vocals
 Stephan Ellis – bass
 Marc Droubay – drums

Additional musicians
 Daryl Dragon – additional keyboards, synthesizers, E-mu Emulator
 Fergie Frederiksen – backing vocals

Production 
 Jim Peterik – producer, arrangements
 Frankie Sullivan – producer, arrangements
 Phil Bonanno – engineer
 Mike Clink – engineer 
 Hill Brim Swimmer – assistant engineer 
 Doug Sax – mastering 
 Glen Christensen – back cover photography

Studios
 Recorded at Rumbo Recorders (Los Angeles, California).
 Mastered at The Mastering Lab (Hollywood, California).

Charts

Certifications

References

External links
 "Eye Of The Tiger" at discogs

1982 albums
Scotti Brothers Records albums
Survivor (band) albums